Comley is a hamlet in Shropshire, England. It is near the A49 road, to the northeast of Church Stretton.

It is situated between two prominent hills: Caer Caradoc to the south and The Lawley to the north.

The hamlet is largely in the civil parish of Cardington, but Comley Farm is just within Longnor.

Shropshire Wildlife Trust have a nature reserve in the former Comley Quarry.

See also
Comley limestone

References

External links

Hamlets in Shropshire
Cardington, Shropshire